Cammy Fraser (born 22 July 1957, in Dundee) is a Scottish former footballer who played as a midfielder. Fraser won league titles and cups with three Scottish clubs, collecting three trophies with Rangers and one each with Heart of Midlothian and Dundee. Fraser also played with Raith Rovers and Montrose in his career. Fraser left the senior game in 1993 to become player/manager at Lochore Welfare. Although Fraser never held a senior coaching position, he applied to become manager of former club Raith in October 2004. Fraser also managed Newburgh. Fraser has two children, Grant and Carol.

Honours
Heart of Midlothian
 Scottish First Division: 1979–80

Dundee
 Scottish League Cup runner-up: 1980–81
 Scottish First Division: 1991–92

Rangers
 Scottish Premier Division: 1986–87
 Scottish League Cup: 1984–85, 1986–87

References

External links

1957 births
Footballers from Dundee
Living people
Heart of Midlothian F.C. players
Dundee F.C. players
Rangers F.C. players
Raith Rovers F.C. players
Montrose F.C. players
Scottish footballers
Scottish Football League players
Association football midfielders
Lochore Welfare F.C. players